Gloucester Road is a major highway in Hong Kong. It is one of the few major roads in Hong Kong with service roads. It was named on 14 June 1929 after Prince Henry, Duke of Gloucester, to commemorate his visit to Hong Kong that year. The road is 2.2 kilometres in length and has a speed limit of 70 km/h.

Location
Gloucester Road is in the north of Wan Chai and East Point on Hong Kong Island. It connects to Harcourt Road at its western end and in the east along the west side of Victoria Park it spit-ends into both Causeway Road and the Tai Hang Road flyover. It formed part of Hong Kong's Route 4 and connects to the Island Eastern Corridor via Victoria Park Road before completion of Central–Wan Chai Bypass. The road is connected to the Cross-Harbour Tunnel near the Canal Road Flyover. It runs almost parallel to Lockhart Road.

History

The road was built between 1922 and 1929 by reclamation as a two-lane road on the seafront. It then only connected the Royal Naval Arsenal Yard in Admiralty and Percival Street in Causeway Bay. It was extended to Cleveland Street after World War II. A canal west of Victoria Park Road is also reclaimed to form part of Gloucester Road.

The completion of Cross-Harbour Tunnel, Aberdeen Tunnel and other major thoroughfares around it increased traffic output, and thus a new road adjoined to Gloucester Road was built in the 1960s and opened in 1972, which was named "Waterfront Road"(海傍大道). The original Gloucester Road was then converted to one sided traffic heading westbound only. A number of flyovers was built. In 1980, the two roads was unified under the same name of Gloucester Road. The original Gloucester Road has been since known as "Inner Gloucester Road" or "Gloucester Road service road".

Travelling time
Vehicles traveling on Gloucester Road can choose two separate routes: North Point and Cross-Harbour Tunnel. During peak hours, the average time required to travel to Western Kowloon is 5-8 minutes; the average time required to travel to North Point is 15-20 minutes.

Landmarks
 The Hong Kong Academy for Performing Arts, main campus (No. 1-3)
 Revenue Tower (No. 7-9)
 Telecom House (No. 4-6)
 Immigration Tower (No. 13-15)
 Wan Chai Tower (No. 10-12)
 Luk Kwok Hotel (No. 70-72)
 Wanchai Meetinghouse of the Church of Jesus Christ of Latter-day Saints (No.118)
 Old Wan Chai Police Station, built in 1932, a Grade II Historic Building (No. 123)
 Wan Chai Sports Ground
 The Gloucester (No. 211-216)
 Sino Plaza (Nos. 256-258)
 Elizabeth House (No. 241-255)
 World Trade Centre (No. 277-279)
 Police Officer Club (No. 259-261)
 The Excelsior hotel (No. 280-282)
 Windsor House (No. 313-315)
 Noonday Gun, across the road from the Excelsior
 China Resource Building
 Causeway Bay Typhoon Shelter
 Central Plaza (No. 16-18)
 Pico Tower (No. 64-66)
 Sun Hung Kai Centre (No. 25-27)
 Lamborghini Hong Kong Showroom (No. 66)

See also
 List of streets and roads in Hong Kong

References

External links

Google Maps of Gloucester Road

Former Part of Route 4 (Hong Kong)
Causeway Bay
Wan Chai
Roads on Hong Kong Island